Katale Khor  is a cave located in Zanjan Province, Iran. It is situated 120 km south of Zanjan city and is about 410 km from Tehran. The name, Katale Khor, means "mount of the sun".  The road from Zanjan to Katale Khor passes Soltaniyeh, an ancient Ilkhanid city.

The cave was discovered about 90 years ago. It is currently the longest cave of the country with 12860m of surveyed cave passages.

References

External links

Katale Khor Cave Official Website

Landforms of Zanjan Province
Caves of Iran
Limestone caves
Tourist attractions in Zanjan Province